Zdeněk Svoboda (born 20 May 1972) is a former professional footballer who played for as a midfielder a number of clubs, most significantly for Sparta Prague in the Gambrinus liga.

Club career
Svoboda was born in Brno, Czechoslovakia. He notably played for Sparta Prague, where he spent nine seasons and made over 150 appearances.

International career
Svoboda gained nine caps with the Czech Republic national team.

Managerial career
In July 2009, Svoboda took up his first coaching role as head coach for the Sparta Prague B team.

References

External links
 
 Zdeněk Svoboda at MaltaFootball.com
 

1972 births
Living people
Czech footballers
Footballers from Brno
Association football midfielders
Czech Republic international footballers
1997 FIFA Confederations Cup players
Czech First League players
Belgian Pro League players
Maltese Premier League players
FC Zbrojovka Brno players
Dukla Prague footballers
AC Sparta Prague players
K.V.C. Westerlo players
Sliema Wanderers F.C. players
BV Cloppenburg players
Czech expatriate footballers
Czech expatriate sportspeople in Belgium
Expatriate footballers in Belgium
Czech expatriate sportspeople in Germany
Expatriate footballers in Germany
Czech expatriate sportspeople in Malta
Expatriate footballers in Malta